Thomas King Carroll (April 29, 1793 – October 3, 1873) served as the 21st Governor of the state of Maryland in the United States from 1830 to 1831.  He also served as a judge, and in the Maryland House of Delegates from 1816 to 1817.

Biography
He was born at Kingston Hall, in Somerset County, Maryland on April 29, 1793, the son of Col. Henry James Carroll and Elizabeth (Barnes) King. He was related to Charles Carroll of Carrollton, who was one of the Founding Fathers of the United States.  He attended Charlotte Hall School, then in 1802, he entered Washington Academy in Somerset County where he remained for the next eight years.  He then become a junior at the University of Pennsylvania and graduated in 1811. Carroll studied law, first in the office of Ephraim King Wilson in Snow Hill, then under Robert Goodloe Harper in Baltimore. On June 23, 1814, he had married Julianna Stevenson and they had nine children, one of whom was Anna Ella Carroll (1815–1893).

Following his father's death, he returned to Kingston Hall where he became the manager of the family's estate. Shortly after, he became active in the political affairs of that county. During the sessions of 1816 and 1817, Carroll was elected without opposition to the House of Delegates. He was a member of the Levy Court of Somerset County between July 1825 and February 1826, when he was appointed Judge of the Orphans’ Court. He was serving in that office when he was elected Governor in December 1829. He had also served as a Senatorial elector in 1821 and 1826.

Carroll was elected governor on January 4, 1830, defeating incumbent Daniel Martin by a vote of 50 to 43. While governor, he joined in the movement to improve the collegiate department of the University of Maryland, as well as that of advocating a statewide public school system. He also aided veterans of the Revolutionary War in their efforts to receive pensions and other benefits from then federal government. He lost reelection to Martin, and retired at the end of his one-year term. Carroll is the only Maryland Governor with the same predecessor and successor.

Carroll retired to Kingston Hall at the close of his administration and lived there until 1840, when he moved to Dorchester County, Maryland, residing on a large estate near Church Creek. When Zachary Taylor became president in 1849, he appointed Carroll Naval Officer of the Port of Baltimore.  (Naval Officers, Collectors and other appointees were responsible for assessing and collecting customs duties at U.S. ports, and for levying fines on those who attempted to avoid duties.  They were compensated based on a percentage of the duties and fines collected, making the positions highly sought after political appointments.)

He died at his home Walnut Landing, in Dorchester County on October 3, 1873, and was buried in Old Trinity Church Cemetery following Masonic burial services.

See also

 Carroll family

References

External links

Democratic Party governors of Maryland
Democratic Party members of the Maryland House of Delegates
Maryland state court judges
People from Somerset County, Maryland
1793 births
1873 deaths
Thomas
People from Dorchester County, Maryland